Les Saveurs de Jean-Christophe Novelli, also known as Les Saveurs, was a restaurant in Curzon Street, Mayfair, London. Owned by Marco Pierre White in the mid 1990s, it was purchased by Jean-Christophe Novelli in April 1997. The restaurant was Novelli's sixth to be opened in the Novelli Group, in agreement with Rocco Forte's RF Hotels. In the contract, Novelli agreed to pay 10% of turnover or a minimum of £100,000 a year to Rocco Forte.

The restaurant opened in 1998, but was closed just a year later after losing money. Gordon Ramsay described the takeover as "astonishing, and involved Jean-Christophe Novelli, a man who Marco probably thinks should be in his eternal debt. Marco was dying to get his hands on Les Saveurs, in Curzon Street." Hospitality described the restaurant as "the upmarket Mayfair eatery that earned him [Novelli] yet another Michelin Star".

The venue reopened in 1999 as Novelli at Curzon Street.

References

Restaurants in London